105.5 Brigada News FM (DXYD 105.5 MHz) is an FM station owned and operated by Brigada Mass Media Corporation. Its studios and transmitter are located at Derequito Bldg., Purok- 7, Brgy. Poblacion, Trento, Agusan del Sur.

References

External links
Brigada News FM Trento FB Page
Brigada News FM Trento Website

Radio stations established in 2017